Baphetoidea is a superfamily of early tetrapods. It includes the family Baphetidae and several more basal genera such as Eucritta and Spathicephalus (which has been given its own family Spathicephalidae). The superfamily has also been called Loxommatoidea, but this name is a junior synonym of Baphetoidea.

Taxonomy 
Baphetoidea was named by Edward Drinker Cope in 1875. The name Loxommatoidea was erected by D.M.S. Watson in 1929 for baphetids such as Loxomma, which were then known as loxommatids. Loxommatids were later shown to be members of Baphetidae, and Loxommatoidea was synonymized with Baphetoidea as a result. Because Baphetoidea was the first erected name, it has priority over Loxommatoidea.

References 

 
Carboniferous vertebrates
Vertebrate superfamilies